Eteobalea eurinella is a moth in the family Cosmopterigidae. It is found in Russia (Primorye).

References

Natural History Museum Lepidoptera generic names catalog

Eteobalea
Moths described in 1986